The Cage of Death is Combat Zone Wrestling's biggest show since 1999. It always features the Cage of Death match, a steel cage with various weapons littered in the cage. Electrified cage walls, cacti, tables, light tubes, glass, thumbtacks, baseball bats, barbed wire, fire and numerous other weapons and objects have been used in it. The first two were simple either pin and/or submit to win cage matches with weapons littered in and around the cage. The Cage of Death also has different formats and stipulations: singles, tag team, or gauntlet. Each Cage of Death features two or more wrestlers in the cage. For Cage of Death 5, 6, and 7, WarGames stipulations were used.

Events

History

Cage of Death I

The first Cage Of Death  was held on October 16, 1999, in Mantua Township, New Jersey, where Lobo defeated Justice Pain in the first Cage of Death match for the Iron Man title. The first Cage of Death that could be a separate built unit or put on a ring with the ropes taken down. Two parallel sides of the cage are made of steel chain link fencing and the two others are made of steel bars. Inside the cage, littered in a ring, and attached to cage walls are full of different weapons (barbed wire, glass panes, cacti, tables, ladders, light tubes, trash cans, etc.) There is a scaffold across the top of the cage and elevated barbed wire boards on the outside of the ring.

Cage of Death II

Cage of Death II took place in Sewell, New Jersey, on September 9, 2000. That night the Cage was host to two matches. In the first match, then CZW World champion Lobo defeated Zandig to retain his title. Big Japan Pro Wrestling (BJW) wrestler Ryuji Yamakawa had hit the ring during the match and Zandig (who had spent much time that year wrestling for BJW) had lost due to Yamakawa's interference. The second Cage of Death was same cage as Cage of Death but its explosively electrified.

Cage of Death III

Cage of Death 3 was the third annual Cage of Death event produced by the Combat Zone Wrestling professional wrestling promotion. It took place on December 15, 2001. At the CZW Arena in Philadelphia, Pennsylvania. The event was at the first time in the CZW Arena.

Due to their upcoming annual COD show at the end of 2001, the company needed a bigger venue and made their debut in the ECW Arena, formerly Viking Hall and currently The Arena. The venue was the first sellout in the building since the era of ECW, and hundreds were turned away from the biggest show in the promotions history.

Ty Street wrestled Mongoose to a no-contest. Jeff Rocker ran in and then Nate Hatred and Nick Gage came out and destroyed everyone. Nick Gage and Nate Hatred defeated a masked team suspiciously looking like Jay and Mark Briscoe (who wrestled under masks presumably to get around the selectively enforced Pennsylvania age restrictions). NWA Southwest workers Joey Corman defeated Samir and Brad Michaels in a 3-Way Dance. Corman pinned Michaels after hitting the spin doctor. In what had been billed as a match with Zandig and Glen Osbourne; Osbourne, Lobo, and Danny Rose all got involved in a big brawl with Zandig until Greg from Tough Enough made the save.

In an elimination match, The S.A.T. defeated Chris Divine, Quiet Storm and Brian XL (with Pastor Jim). The stipulation for the match was if Divine, Storm, and XL lose the match, Pastor Jim was out of CZW for good.  The order of elimination: Joel Maximo (by Divine), Divine (by Jose Maximo), Jose Maximo (by XL), Brian XL (by Red), Quiet Storm (by Amazing Red, after the Spanish Fly by the Maximos and the Infrared Splash).

Jon Dahmer and Fast Eddie Valentine defeated Chri$ Ca$h & GQ. Trent Acid defeated Ruckus to win the CZW/BJW Junior Heavyweight Championship. Initially, both men were counted out, but the match was restarted by John Zandig with a ladder involved. Acid won the match with the Yakuza Kick, but was put through a table by Big Japan's Winger, who then walked off with both belts. Johnny Kashmere defeated Menace with the Cradlebreaker. Mad Man Pondo defeated Z-Barr – The returning Pondo got the pin after hitting Barr with a splash on top of a chair and his patented Stop Sign. Adam Flash defeated Nick Berk and Nick Mondo in a Falls Count Anywhere match to win the CZW Iron Man Championship.

Inside the Cage of Death, were a jackhammer, a cactus, garbage cans, a truck hood, and tables; and was topped by a scaffold. Justice Pain defeated Wifebeater to retain the CZW World Heavyweight Title as both men crashed through tables in the ring off of the scaffold that topped of the cage of death.

As the match finished, the Arena lights went out. In a kayfabe angle, former ECW owner Tod Gordon, along with The Blue Meanie, Pitbull #1, Rockin' Rebel and Rocco Rock were in the ring, trashed CZW, with Gordon calling the fans "ingrates" for chanting CZW. After they abused Justice Pain and Wifebeater, the CZW locker room crashed the cage, and the lights went out again. When they came back on, The Sandman was standing in the middle of the ring.

Sandman then turned on his former ECW compatriots. At the end Sandman stripped off his ECW T-shirt for a CZW shirt and had a beer with John Zandig.

Cage of Death IV

Cage of Death IV  took place on December 13, 2002, in Philadelphia, Pennsylvania at the Viking Hall and saw John Zandig defeat Lobo in a Cage of Death match for the ownership of CZW. This was the last Cage Of Death to use electricity as a hazard (Lobo was electrocuted early in the match).

Cage of Death V: Suspended

Cage of Death V: Suspended was the fifth annual Cage of Death event produced by the Combat Zone Wrestling professional wrestling promotion. It took place on December 13, 2003.

The main feud going into the Cage of Death match was between Team Zandig (John Zandig, Nick Gage, Ian Knoxx, Wifebeater, and Lobo) and the HI-V The Messiah, Adam Flash, Nate Hatred, Trent Acid, Johnny Kashmere, and B-Boy). Although Team Zandig's sixth member was New Jack, he turned on Team Zandig and joined the HI-V. The Cage match also differed from the previous year, in that there were two rings; one of them was surrounded by the cage, and the other was filled with thumbtacks (which in kayfabe storyline was claimed to be "one million"). Above the two rings was scaffolding walkway on which the wrestlers could walk on. The match started with two members of each team, and every 90 seconds a wrestler, from either team, entered the match according to the number they drew before the match started. Elimination occurred when both a wrestlers' feet hit the floor.

Cage of Death VI

Cage of Death VI took place on December 11, 2004, in the ECW Arena where there were two Cage Of Death matches. One saw Team Ca$h (Chri$ Ca$h, J.C. Bailey, Nate Webb, and SeXXXy Eddy) defeat Team Blackout (Ruckus, Sabian, Eddie Kingston, and Jack Evans). The other match saw the battle of The H8 Club as Wifebeater and Justice Pain took on Nate Hatred and Nick Gage. For Cage of Death 6 there were eliminations that would happen when a wrestler would hit the arena floor much like Cage of Death 5 the year before, the difference being that the tag team titles were hanging on a scaffold stretched across the length of the top of the cage overlooking the two rings.

In the 4 on 4 WarGames elimination match, wrestlers were eliminated when they hit the floor. The cage surrounded two rings, weapons littered around two rings, and there was also a scaffold on top of the cage where Maven Bentley and Robbie Mireno were holding the CZW Tag Team belts.

The other Cage of Death match was a Fans Bring the Weapons match inside the cage. Wifebeater and Justice Pain won after Nick Gage turned on Nate Hatred by driving him through a pane of glass covered in salt and thumbtacks. Immediately after the match Pain and Gage turned on Wifebeater.

Cage of Death VII: Living in Sin

Cage Of Death VII took place on December 10, 2005, in Philadelphia, Pennsylvania, at the New Alhambra Arena, where H8 Club & John Zandig defeated The Tough Crazy Bastards (Necro Butcher and Toby Klein), and Joker. This Cage of Death was the large eight-sided cage that surrounds the entire ringside area with a barbed-wire spider net set up on one side and glass set up on another side with tables underneath and two scaffold platforms across the ring from each other. Hardcore and extreme wrestling weapons such as thumbtack turnbuckles, barbed wire bats, staple guns, light tubes, barbed wire, and others littered around for wrestlers to use.

Cage of Death VIII: Coming Undone

Cage of Death VIII took place on December 9, 2006, where in a Loser Must Retire Fans Bring the Weapons Cage of Death match, Nick Gage pinned John Zandig in a four way that also involved Lobo and LuFisto (in a last minute addition). The cage was an all new design made of wood and barbed wire featuring platforms, barbed wire spider nets, glass, barbed wire-wrapped baseball bats, and all other different assorted weapons. This was the first ever four way Fans Bring The Weapons Cage of Death deathmatch, and the first one with a female participant.

Cage of Death IX

Cage of Death IX was the ninth annual Cage of Death event produced by the Combat Zone Wrestling professional wrestling promotion. It took place on December 8, 2007, at the CZW Arena in Philadelphia, Pennsylvania. The event was the seventh consecutive Cage of Death at the CZW Arena.

Cage of Death X

Cage of Death X was the tenth annual Cage of Death event produced by the Combat Zone Wrestling professional wrestling promotion. It took place on December 13, 2008, at the CZW Arena in Philadelphia, Pennsylvania. The event was the eighth consecutive Cage of Death at the CZW Arena.

The show opened with a surprise as old CZW favorite Ric Blade came back to the promotion for his first in-ring appearance since 2004, as the referee for the Junior Heavyweight Title Match. The roof for the Cage of Death hung from the ceiling. Also hanging from the ceiling were the tables, ladders, chairs, ropes, rope ladders, and the CZW Junior Heavyweight Title.

Ryan McBride defeated Pinkie Sanchez, IWS regular Dan Paysan, Insanity Pro Wrestling's Carter Gray, and All-American Wrestling/IWA Mid-South Wrestling's Egotistico Fantastico in what may well have been the hottest match of the night to become the new CZW Junior Heavyweight Champion. The finish saw Pinkie Sanchez and Ryan McBride fighting on the ladder – both went to grab the belt and fell down, but McBride was holding the belt when they hit the mat.

Post-match, John Zandig brought out Lobo, Nick Gage, and Wifebeater to the ring to join Ric Blade, and credited them for being the reason why CZW still existed. Then New Alhambra Arena manager Roger Artigiani surprised Zandig by unveiling the 2008 New Alhambra Arena Hardcore Hall of Fame induction banner on the wall joining The Sandman, Terry Funk, Ted "Rocco Rock" Petty and Johnny Grunge as inductees. A video promo followed, with Zandig stating that, "if these five men want the $10,000...they'll have to go through me" – making Zandig the sixth man in the Cage of Death.

In a nice touch, the promotion did its third annual Toys for Tots toy collection, with uniformed Marines at the collection box at the Arena's front door. The Arena would continue the collection at the afternoon's CHIKARA and Velocity Pro Wrestling events. Fans are encouraged to bring a new "unwrapped" toy to the Arena for these shows, as Arena management and the promotions running the venue contribute back to the children of the Philadelphia area.

In a pleasant surprise, Sonjay Dutt plugged CZW after the match and suggested he might return as he could in 2009 (with everyone waiting for the expected heel swerve that for once wasn't forced on by a promoter). 2 Girls, 1 Cup defeated The Olsens, Miracle Ultraviolence Connection, and Team Andrew to retain the CZW Tag Team Titles. Given Nick Gage's concussion at the time, expectations for this match weren't what they might have been under other circumstances. Gage won the match for H8 Club, as he hammered Ruckus at the end with at least 7 Chokebreakers at the end of the match. Ruckus was ruled unable to continue by the referee. Deranged defeated D. J. Hyde in a Fans Bring the Weapons Match. Various toys used included a glass picture frame, a drum, a boat oar with thumb tacks, hand held plastic guitar, and a knife.

The Cage of Death was a double cage structure with a four-sided steel wired cage inside the large four-sided wooden cage, a roof made up of a barbed wire spider net, wooden boards, and a scaffold topping the traditional four-sided original Cage of Death. Surrounding the Cage that surrounded the Cage-enclosed ring was a platform surrounding that with tables, chairs, lemon juice, salt, ladders, sheets of auto glass and other different goodies enclosed by a large second four-sided wooden cage. In the middle of That platform was a vertical wall of glass which exploded after Devon Moore took a "Mother F'n Bomb" through it. Other sick spots saw Devon Moore doing a shooting star press onto all but Zandig, Sami Callihan hitting a senton off the scaffold/spidernet through a barbed wire table on Brain Damage, and Drake Younger Russian legsweeping Danny Havoc off the side of the cage through a barbed wire board propped up by chairs. In the end, Zandig got to the top of the structure to win the match. After the match, Zandig stated that he was trying to prove that "his boys" had their Onita style "fighting spirit" back, and handed out the $10,000 to all five other competitors.

Cage of Death XI

Cage of Death XI was the eleventh annual Cage of Death event produced by the Combat Zone Wrestling professional wrestling promotion. It took place on December 8, 2009, at the CZW Arena in Philadelphia, Pennsylvania. The event was the ninth consecutive Cage of Death at the CZW Arena.

Cage of Death XII

Cage of Death XII was the twelfth annual Cage of Death event produced by the Combat Zone Wrestling professional wrestling promotion. It took place on December 11, 2010, at the CZW Arena in Philadelphia, Pennsylvania. The event was the tenth consecutive Cage of Death at the CZW Arena.

Cage of Death XIII

Cage of Death XIV

Cage of Death XIV was the fourteenth annual Cage of Death event produced by the Combat Zone Wrestling professional wrestling promotion. It took place on December 8, 2012, at the Flyers Skate Zone in Voorhees Township, New Jersey. The main event was Matt Tremont vs CZW Owner D. J. Hyde in the Cage of Death. Special appearances by New Jack and Colt Cabana
happened starting with New Jack putting over CZW and hyping his match against BLKOUT at Extreme Rising on December 29, and Colt Cabanas' first CZW appearance to challenge Greg Excellent.

Cage of Death XV

Cage of Death XV was the fifteenth annual Cage of Death event produced by the Combat Zone Wrestling professional wrestling promotion. It took place on December 14, 2013, at the Flyers Skate Zone in Voorhees Township, New Jersey.

Cage of Death XVI

Cage of Death XVI was the sixteenth annual Cage of Death event produced by the Combat Zone Wrestling professional wrestling promotion. It took place on December 13, 2014, at the Flyers Skate Zone in Voorhees Township, New Jersey.

Cage of Death XVII

Cage of Death XVII was the seventeenth annual Cage of Death event produced by the Combat Zone Wrestling professional wrestling promotion. It took place on December 12, 2015, at the Flyers Skate Zone in Voorhees Township, New Jersey.

Cage of Death 18

Cage of Death 18 was the eighteenth annual Cage of Death event produced by the Combat Zone Wrestling professional wrestling promotion. It took place on December 10, 2016, at the Flyers Skate Zone in Voorhees Township, New Jersey. CZW founder, John Zandig, made an appearance at this event.

Cage of Death 19

Cage of Death 19 was the nineteenth annual Cage of Death event produced by the Combat Zone Wrestling professional wrestling promotion. It took place on December 9, 2017, at the Rastelli Complex in Sewell, New Jersey.

Cage of Death XX

Cage of Death XX was the twentieth annual Cage of Death event produced by the Combat Zone Wrestling professional wrestling promotion. It took place on December 9, 2018, at the 2300 Arena in Philadelphia.

Cage of Death XXI

Cage of Death XXI was the twenty-first annual Cage of Death event produced by the Combat Zone Wrestling professional wrestling promotion. It took place on December 14, 2019, at the 2300 Arena in Voorhees Township, New Jersey.

See also
Combat Zone Wrestling
CZW Best of the Best
CZW Tournament of Death

References

External links
www.czwrestling.com

Combat Zone Wrestling shows
Professional wrestling match types
Recurring events established in 1999